Prikro Department is a department of Iffou Region in Lacs District, Ivory Coast. In 2021, its population was 95,595 and its seat is the settlement of Prikro. The sub-prefectures of the department are Anianou, Famienkro, Koffi-Amonkro, Nafana, and Prikro.

History
Prikro Department was created in 2005 as a second-level subdivision via a split-off from M'Bahiakro Department. At its creation, it was part of N'Zi-Comoé Region.

In 2011, districts were introduced as new first-level subdivisions of Ivory Coast. At the same time, regions were reorganised and became second-level subdivisions and all departments were converted into third-level subdivisions. At this time, Prikro Department became part of Iffou Region in Lacs District.

Notes

Departments of Iffou
2005 establishments in Ivory Coast
States and territories established in 2005